Andrei Aleksandrovich Yakubik (born 24 August 1950) is a former Soviet football player.

Honours
 Soviet Top League winner: 1976 (spring).
 Soviet Cup winner: 1977.
 Olympic bronze: 1972.
 UEFA Cup Winners' Cup finalist: 1972.
 Grigory Fedotov Club member.
 Top 33 players year-end list: 1982.

International career
Yakubik made his debut for USSR on 1 September 1972 in the 1972 Summer Olympics game against Mexico.

External links
  Profile 
 

1950 births
Living people
Footballers from Moscow
Soviet footballers
Russian footballers
Soviet Union international footballers
Soviet Top League players
FC Dynamo Moscow players
Pakhtakor Tashkent FK players
FC Asmaral Moscow players
Footballers at the 1972 Summer Olympics
Olympic bronze medalists for the Soviet Union
Olympic footballers of the Soviet Union
Soviet football managers
FC Asmaral Moscow managers
Olympic medalists in football
Association football midfielders
Association football forwards
Medalists at the 1972 Summer Olympics